Mohammed Abdul-Monem Ali Al-Sharuee (original name: محمد عبد المنعم علي, born ) is an Iraqi male weightlifter, competing in the 56 kg category and representing Iraq at international competitions. He participated at the 2004 Summer Olympics in the 56 kg event. He competed at world championships, most recently at the 2003 World Weightlifting Championships.

Major results

References

External links
 

1981 births
Living people
Iraqi male weightlifters
Weightlifters at the 2004 Summer Olympics
Olympic weightlifters of Iraq
Place of birth missing (living people)